Acartauchenius hamulifer is a species of sheet weaver found in Algeria. It was described by Jacques Denis in 1937.

References

Linyphiidae
Endemic fauna of Algeria
Spiders of North Africa
Spiders described in 1937